40 athletes (29 men and 11 women) from South Africa competed at the 1996 Summer Paralympics in Atlanta, United States and finished 15th on the medal table.

Medallists

See also
South Africa at the Paralympics
South Africa at the 1996 Summer Olympics

References 

Nations at the 1996 Summer Paralympics
1996
Summer Paralympics